In enzymology, a (R)-dehydropantoate dehydrogenase is an enzyme that catalyzes the chemical reaction

(R)-4-dehydropantoate + NAD + HO  (R)-3,3-dimethylmalate + NADH + 2 H

The 3 substrates of this enzyme are (R)-4-dehydropantoate, NAD, and HO, whereas its 3 products are (R)-3,3-dimethylmalate, NADH, and H.

This enzyme belongs to the family of oxidoreductases, specifically those acting on the aldehyde or oxo group of donor with NAD+ or NADP+ as acceptor.  The systematic name of this enzyme class is (R)-4-dehydropantoate:NAD+ 4-oxidoreductase. Other names in common use include D-aldopantoate dehydrogenase, D-2-hydroxy-3,3-dimethyl-3-formylpropionate:diphosphopyridine, and nucleotide (DPN+) oxidoreductase.  This enzyme participates in pantothenate and coa biosynthesis.

References

 

EC 1.2.1
NADH-dependent enzymes
Enzymes of unknown structure